Hawaii Five-0 is a police procedural series developed for television by Alex Kurtzman, Roberto Orci, and Peter M. Lenkov, based on the 1968 series of the same name created by Leonard Freeman. It premiered on CBS on Monday, September 20, 2010, 42 years to the day from the premiere of the original show, September 20, 1968. The title of each episode (except the pilot and the season 3 episode "Hookman") is in Hawaiian rather than English.

The series covers the actions of a small special state task force created by the Governor of Hawaii, Pat Jameson, to investigate serious crimes throughout the Islands, as Hawaii does not have a conventional state police force. The team is headed by Lieutenant Commander Steve McGarrett, USNR (and former Navy SEAL) as it investigates crimes ranging from terrorism to kidnapping. McGarrett chooses as his partner Honolulu PD (and former Newark PD) Detective Danny Williams, and together McGarrett and Williams lead a team that includes Capt. Lou Grover, Adam Noshimuri, Quinn Liu, Junior Reigns and Tani Rey.

Series overview

Episodes

Season 1 (2010–11)

Season 2 (2011–12)

Season 3 (2012–13)

Season 4 (2013–14)

Season 5 (2014–15)

Season 6 (2015–16)

Season 7 (2016–17)

Season 8 (2017–18)

Season 9 (2018–19)

Season 10 (2019–20)

Ratings

References

External links 
 
 
 List of Hawaii Five-0 episodes at The Futon Critic
 

 
Lists of American crime drama television series episodes
Hawaii Five-o episodes